The Five Seasons is the seventeenth studio album by British folk rock band Fairport Convention.

Track listing

Side one
 "Claudy Banks" (Traditional) - 5:53
 "Cup of Tea!"/"A Loaf of Bread"/"Miss Monahan's" (Allcock, Traditional) - 3:16
 "All Your Beauty" (Barry Lowe, Martin White) - 2:55
 "Sock In It" (Dave Whetstone) - 5:29
 "Gold" (Peter Blegvad) - 5:06

Side two
 "Ginnie" (Huw Williams) - 4:10
 "Mock Morris '90" (The Green Man/The Cropredy Badger/Molly On The Jetty) (Ric Sanders)  - 4:53	
 "The Card Song"/"Shuffle the Pack" (Allcock, Mattacks, Nicol) - 4:26
 "The Wounded Whale" (Archie Fisher, Traditional) - 6:43

 Bonus Track on CD release
 "Rhythm of the Time" (Dave Whetstone) - 5:52

Release history
1990, December: UK  LP, New Routes RUE 005
1990, December : UK CD, New Routes RUE CD 005
1990, December : US CD, Rough Trade NR 005-2
1991, December : UK CD, Woodworm Records WRCD 019
1995, December : UK CD, HTD Records HTD CD 48

Personnel
Fairport Convention
 Maartin Allcock - guitars, bouzouki, mandolin, accordion, keyboards, vocals
 Ric Sanders - violin
 Dave Pegg -  acoustic & bass guitars, vocals
 Dave Mattacks - drums, percussion, keyboards, harpsichord
 Simon Nicol - guitars, vocals, dobro
Technical
 Tim Matyear - engineer
 Barry Hammond with Simon Nicol and Dave Mattacks - mixing

References and notes

External links

1990 albums
Fairport Convention albums